Groß Lindow is a municipality in the Oder-Spree district, in Brandenburg, Germany.

Demography

References

Localities in Oder-Spree